Jachranka  is a village in the administrative district of Gmina Serock, within Legionowo County, Masovian Voivodeship, in east-central Poland.

The village has a population of 882.
Nowadays, it is the biggest tourist point in Serock Munticipality with the Hotel Warszawianka, the main spot of Greek Football Representation in Euro 2012.

References

Jachranka